Afsarabad (also Romanized as Afsarābād; also known as Tūtestān and Tūtūstān) is a village in Doab Rural District of Doab Samsami District of Kuhrang County, Chaharmahal and Bakhtiari province, Iran. At the 2006 census, its population was 503 in 77 households. The following census in 2011 counted 456 people in 100 households. The latest census in 2016 showed a population of 329 people in 122 households; it was the largest village in its rural district. The village is populated by Lurs.

References 

Kuhrang County

Populated places in Chaharmahal and Bakhtiari Province

Populated places in Kuhrang County

Luri settlements in Chaharmahal and Bakhtiari Province